Candice Rickelle Glover (born November 22, 1989) is an American R&B singer and actress who won the twelfth season of American Idol. Glover is the first winner to have auditioned three times before being cast for the live shows. Her debut album Music Speaks was released on February 18, 2014.

Early life 
Candice Rickelle Glover was born on November 22, 1989, in Beaufort, South Carolina, to John and Carole Glover. She is the oldest of seven children. She graduated from Beaufort High School in 2008.

American Idol

Overview 
Glover auditioned in Charlotte, North Carolina. She previously auditioned in the ninth and eleventh seasons. In the ninth season Simon Cowell said that he could not see Glover being anything more than a lounge singer and she was cut during the final 70 round. She was eliminated by producers during the ninth season when she forgot the lyrics to her song "Chasing Pavements" by Adele.

Season 11 
Glover auditioned in Savannah, Georgia. She sang "Blame It on Me" by Chrisette Michele. She advanced, but her audition was not aired. In round one, she performed Karina's "Slow Motion". In round three, she sang "Someone like You" by Adele, where she received a standing ovation from the judges. She performed "It Doesn't Matter Anymore" by Buddy Holly with eleventh season finalists DeAndre Brackensick and Jessica Sanchez in the group round and was eliminated.

Season 12 
During her audition for the twelfth season, Glover sang "Syrup & Honey" by Duffy, where she received a standing ovation. Judge Randy Jackson said that she was the best performer by far in the competition. Mariah Carey called her singing "The best singing we have heard thus far." Glover advanced to Hollywood. In an interview, she said, "I thought they were going to get sick of seeing my face." For the first round in Hollywood, she sang "Impossible" by Christina Aguilera. For the second round, she performed "Hit Em Up Style" with Kamaria Ousley, Denise Jackson, and Melinda Ademi. This was named the best group the judges had seen all day. In round three, she put a jazzy twist on Alicia Keys's "Girl on Fire". It was later announced that Glover was one of the top 20 girls of the season and she advanced to Las Vegas. In Vegas, she performed "Natural Woman" by Aretha Franklin. In the semi-finals of the competition, Glover performed "Ordinary People" by John Legend. On March 7, 2013, she was voted into the Top 10. Her Top 10 performance of "I (Who Have Nothing)" by Ben E. King earned her enough votes to land among the night's top three contestants, along with Kree Harrison and Angie Miller. After her Top 6 performances, Glover earned enough votes to land in the night's top two contestants, along with Kree Harrison. She covered "Lovesong" by The Cure and broke down in tears after receiving a standing ovation. For the first time, after her Top 4 performance, she landed in the bottom two. On May 16, Glover won the contest and her debut single 'I Am Beautiful' was released to music store outlets.

Performances and results

Season 9

Season 11

Season 12 

 When Ryan Seacrest announced the results for this particular night, Glover was in the bottom two with Amber Holcomb, but was declared safe as no one was eliminated.
 Due to the surprise non-elimination at the top 4, the top 4 remained intact for another week.

Music Speaks and upcoming second studio album 

Immediately following the finale broadcast on May 16, 2013, Glover's debut album, Music Speaks, along with her debut single "I Am Beautiful" was available for pre-order; this was a first for the Idol series. On May 17, 2013, Glover performed the single on The Tonight Show with Jay Leno. On May 20, 2013, Glover performed on Live! with Kelly and Michael.
Glover confirmed on May 21, to be working on a more R&B influenced second single to be released.
In its first week "I Am Beautiful" reached number 33 on Hot R&B/Hip-Hop Songs and number 93 on the Billboard Hot 100.

Glover took part in the American Idols LIVE! Tour 2013, beginning on July 19 and ending on August 31, 2013. Her debut album Music Speaks was released on February 18, 2014, after being pushed back from the original July 16 and October 8, 2013, dates.

Glover's second single from her debut album is called "Cried," and was released on November 25, 2013. "Cried" debuted at number 28 on the Billboard Adult R&B chart in January 2014, and has peaked at number 18.

Glover has begun work on her second studio album, due out in 2016. She is writing all of the material on the album herself. She announced on her Facebook page that the album will be more "her" and that there will be a duet with fellow Idol contestant Amber Holcomb.

Glover was also featured on Chadd Black's  single, "Love No Fear", which was released on February 14, 2015. She will be releasing a mixtape with Black sometime in 2016. In January 2016, she announced that she had parted ways with 19 Recordings/Interscope. Her new album will be released independently, and she hopes to work with Jazmine Sullivan, Chris Brown, and/or Drake on it.

She returned to Idol for the series finale on April 7, 2016. She performed with all the returning alumni to open the show, singing "One Voice." Later, she performed "Joy to the World" with Melinda Doolittle.

Broadway 
Glover sang on Broadway in the show "Home For the Holidays, Live on Broadway" which was presented November 17 to December 30, 2017, at the August Wilson Theatre. Other vocal performers included Josh Kaufman, Bianca Ryan, Peter Hollens and Evynne Hollens.

Personal life 
Glover says she wants to be a counselor to help girls through what she went through as a teenager. Nicki Minaj broke down in tears after Glover's performance of "Next to Me", saying that Glover has gotten so much more confident during her time on the show. Glover said she would never wear a dress on Idol, but she eventually wore one during her performance of "Somewhere," "You've Changed" by Billie Holiday and the finale. After this, girls began tweeting her saying she was their inspiration and that she made them feel more confident. Her musical influences include Christina Aguilera, Jazmine Sullivan and Brandy. In 2011, Sullivan retweeted Glover's YouTube cover of "Chasing Pavements" by Adele and called it "amazing". Glover once again performed this song on the finale of American Idol.

Discography

Studio albums

Singles

Promotional singles

Music videos

Filmography

See also 
List of Idols winners

References

External links 
 
 
 Candice Glover on American Idol
 

1989 births
Living people
American Idol winners
American rhythm and blues singer-songwriters
American gospel singers
People from Beaufort, South Carolina
Actresses from South Carolina
African-American actresses
African-American women singer-songwriters
African-American Christians
19 Recordings artists
Interscope Records artists
21st-century American actresses
American contemporary R&B singers
People from Saint Helena Island, South Carolina
21st-century African-American women singers
Singer-songwriters from South Carolina